Austromitra valarieae is a species of sea snail, a marine gastropod mollusk, in the family Costellariidae, the ribbed miters.

Distribution
This species occurs in KwaZulu-Natal.

References

valarieae